A mark system is a penal system that allows prisoners to earn privileges and early release by accumulating "marks" through good behavior, achievement, and thrift. As devised by Alexander Maconochie, the goal of a mark system was to encourage reform by placing prisoners in control of their own destinies. The mark system sought to limit official discretion to the greatest extent possible and to make the release process transparent for prisoners. It was a determinate sentencing scheme in that the number of marks prisoners needed to earn, tabulated according to the seriousness of their offense, would be disclosed to them upfront.

The mark system was implemented by Walter Crofton in Irish prisons and was also tried by Elmira Reformatory and other U.S. prisons. Prisoners were allowed to advance through grades as they earned marks. In 1940, the U.S. Department of Justice explained that the mark system failed because it depended on the quality of the prison leadership and staff and was too difficult for ordinary prison officers to implement:

References

Penology
Prisons